Archimedes Russell (June 13,1840 – April 3, 1915) was an American architect most active in the Syracuse, New York area.

Born in Andover, Massachusetts and trained under local architect Horatio Nelson White, Russell served as a professor of architecture at Syracuse University from 1873 through 1881.

In the course of his career he designed over 850 commercial and civic buildings in the central New York region, including the David H. Burrell Mansion in Little Falls, New York, a Queen Anne/Romanesque Revival stone mansion.

Work 
Russell's work, much of which has been listed on the National Register of Historic Places, includes:

 Mrs. I. L. Crego House, 1870
 West Sibley Hall, 1870, and McGraw Hall, 1872 at Cornell University
 First Baptist Church of Camillus, 1879
 Otsego County (New York) Courthouse, 1880
 Crouse College, Syracuse University, 1881
 Third National Bank, aka the Community Chest Building, Syracuse, 1885
 Overlook, Little Falls, New York, 1889
 West Hill School (Canajoharie, New York), 1891–93
 Bastable Theatre, Syracuse, 1893
 Central Technical High School, Syracuse, 1900
 Onondaga County Court House, Columbus Circle, Syracuse, 1904-1907 (with murals by William de Leftwich Dodge)
 C. W. Snow and Company Warehouse, 1913
 St. Matthew's Church, East Syracuse, 1915
 St. Anthony of Padua Church, Syracuse 
 St Lucy Church, Syracuse, 1873
 Dey Brothers Building, 401 S. Salina Street, 1893, a contributing building in the South Salina Street Downtown Historic District

References

External links

 Archimedes Russell, at Syracuse Then and Now

1840 births
1915 deaths
19th-century American architects
People from Andover, Massachusetts
Architects from Syracuse, New York
Architects from Massachusetts
Syracuse University faculty